The United States women's national rugby league team, also known as the Redtails represents United States of America in women's rugby league. They are administered by the USA Rugby League.

The team was announced on 9 April 2019 and they intend to bid to play in both the 2021 and the 2025 Rugby League World Cups.

Current squad
The following players participated in the Redtails' inaugural Test Match on Saturday, 16 April 2022. Most players were selected from Rugby Union clubs. The teams was coached by Ady Cooney

Development squad
The following players were included in a development squad that played in a "Select" match on Saturday, 16 April, 2022, prior to the Test Match.
 Backs: Danielle Walko-Siua, Allison Kurtz, Maxine Fonua, Mona Tupou. Juliana Lima, Alecia Eschenbrenner, Devonna Francis (Captain).
 Forwards: Joanne Absher, Shamarica Scott, Paris Hart, Hayley Wortmann, Terree Okabe (Vice-Captain), Keta Sutton
 Interchange: Bee Blackmon, Ariane Lozac'hmeir, Chyna Hamm
 Coach: Ben Calverly

Results

Full internationals 
The inaugural matches for the United States national women's rugby league team occurred on Saturday, 16 April, 2022. A second team match opened proceedings at Burnaby Lake Regional Park, British Columbia, Canada. This game was followed by a Test Match.

Second team matches

References

External links
 American National Rugby League official site
 Google-Video
 American All Stars RL Team – rl1908.com

American National Rugby League
Women's national rugby league teams
W
Rugby league in the United States